HMS Spartan was a Royal Navy 38-gun fifth-rate frigate, launched at Rochester in 1806. During the Napoleonic Wars she was active in the Adriatic and in the Ionian Islands. She then moved to the American coast during the War of 1812, where she captured a number of small vessels, including a US Revenue Cutter and a privateer, the Dart. She then returned to the Mediterranean, where she remained for a few years. She went on to serve off the American coast again, and in the Caribbean, before being broken up in 1822.

Napoleonic Wars
Spartans first captain was George Astle, but he was soon replaced by Captain Jahleel Brenton, who took Spartan to the Adriatic Sea for service in the Adriatic campaign. In May 1807, Spartan engaged Annibal, two frigates (Pomone and Incorruptible), and the corvette Victorieuse off Cabrera in the Mediterranean.

Spartan was very active in the region, attacking numerous French coastal convoys, towns and small warships and in 1809 was employed in attacks on the Ionian Islands, landing troops on Zante and Cerigo in successful amphibious operations.

In 1810, Spartan was operating off Naples and there fought an inconclusive engagement against a much larger Neapolitan squadron on 3 May, for which Brenton was highly rewarded.

War of 1812
In 1811, Brenton's brother Edward Pelham Brenton took command and operated off the American Eastern Seaboard during the War of 1812, attacking shipping off Cape Sable but otherwise having little success against American merchant ships.

In July 1812, Spartan and  captured three American vessels:
 16 July: schooner Active, Peterson, master, of Salem, with 2 guns and 20 or 22 men. The capture took place off Cape Sable. Spartan burnt the schooner.      
 17 July: brig George, of 211 tons, sailing from Messina to Salem with a cargo of wine, brandy, opium, oil, etc.; and
 18 July: schooner Hiram, of 132 tons, sailing from Lisbon to Salem with a cargo of fruit and dollars.

On 15 July Spartan and  captured the brig Start. Start, of 173 tons (bm), P.Hazelton, master, had been sailing from St Ubes to Newburyport, Massachusetts with a cargo of salt.

The boats of Spartan and  captured the US Revenue Cutter Commodore Barry on 3 August in the Little River, Bay of Fundy, together with three privateer schooners, Madison, Olive, and Spence (or Spruce). Commodore Barry was armed with six guns and each of the schooners was armed with two guns. Before the British captured the vessels their crews escaped. They had erected batteries on shore, using the guns from their vessels. They resisted, inflicting some casualties, but then evaded capture. Even so, some men were captured on Commodore Barry and remained prisoners of war until paroled in June 1813. Prize money to the crew of the Spartan for the Commodore Barry was paid in July 1820.

Spartan was part of Sir John Borlase Warren's squadron when on 17 September she captured , an American ship returning from Chile and bound to Baltimore. Spartan sent Melantho into Halifax, Nova Scotia, where the Vice admiralty court condemned her in prize. Spartan shared the prize money with Statira, Acasta, Nymphe, Orpheus, Maidstone, Aeolus and Emulous.

On 17 October 1812  and Spartan were in company when Maidstone captured the American privateer brig Rapid on the Saint George's Bank. Rapid, of 190 tons (bm), John Weeks, master, was armed with 14 cannon – twelve carronades of various sizes and two long 6-pounder guns – but her crew had thrown eight of her cannons overboard to lighten her during the nine-hour chase. She had a crew of 84 men and was three days out of Portland. Her backers had provisioned her for a three-month cruise first off the Azores, Madeira and the Cape Verde Islands, and then off Cayenne and Bermuda.

In 1814, Spartan returned to Portsmouth, where command passed to Phipps Hornby, who briefly served with her in the Mediterranean. While commander of Spartan, Hornby participated in the capture of Elba from the French, for which he was invested with the Austrian order of St Joseph of Würzburg.

Post-war
With the end of the war in 1815, Spartan remained in the Mediterranean under Captain William Furlong Wise, who in 1818 was able to negotiate compensation of $35,000 from the current Dey of Algiers following the depredations of Algerian pirates under the previous Dey, who had died of the plague.

Fate
In 1819 and 1820, Spartan visited the Caribbean and North America. Spartan  was laid up and then broken up in 1822.

Notes, citations, and references

Citations

References
 
 
 Smith, Joshua M. (2011) Battle for the Bay: The Naval War of 1812.  Fredericton, NB: Goose Lane Publications.
 
 Wells, William R., II (1998) "US Revenue Cutters Captured in the War of 1812". The American Neptune Vol. 58, No. 3 (Summer), pp. 225–41.

External links
 
 Ships of the Old Navy

Fifth-rate frigates of the Royal Navy
Ships built on the River Medway
1806 ships
War of 1812 ships of the United Kingdom